Eric Henry Compton  (14 March 1902 – 2 April 1982) was a New Zealand police officer. He served as Commissioner of Police between 1953 and 1955.

Compton was born in Hastings, New Zealand, on 14 March 1902. In 1953, he was awarded the Queen Elizabeth II Coronation Medal, and in the 1954 Royal Visit Honours he was appointed a Commander of the Royal Victorian Order.

References

1902 births
1982 deaths
New Zealand farmers
New Zealand Commissioners of Police
New Zealand Commanders of the Royal Victorian Order